Gaius Bellicius Flaccus Torquatus was a Roman senator during the reign of Antoninus Pius. He was consul prior in 143 with Herodes Atticus as his colleague. Flaccus Torquatus was the son of Gaius Bellicius Flaccus Torquatus Tebanianus, consul of 124, and the older brother of Gaius Bellicius Calpurnius Torquatus, consul of 148.

See also 
 Bellicia gens

References 

2nd-century Romans
Imperial Roman consuls
Flaccus Torquatus, Gaius